Clypeastericola is a genus of medium-sized sea snails, marine gastropod mollusks in the family Eulimidae.

Species
There are two known species to exist within the genus Clypeastericola, these include the following:

 Clypeastericola clypeastericola (Habe, 1976)
 Clypeastericola natalensis (Warén, 1994)

References

External links
 To World Register of Marine Species

Eulimidae